Christophe Brandt (born 6 May 1977) is a Belgian former professional road bicycle racer, who competed professionally between 2000 and 2010 for the  and  teams. He now works as the general manager for UCI ProTeam , and as a directeur sportif for its junior team, UCI Continental team .

Career
In the early 2000s he was a good rider in the Grand Tours, like a 14th place in the 2004 Giro d'Italia and 33rd in the 2002 Tour de France. In 2004, he returned a positive test for methadone. He believed the test was a result of a tainted nutritional supplement that he had taken to cure a liver problem. The chemist who had prepared Brandt's prescription confirmed he had been working with methadone on the same day he had prepared Brandt's prescription. This did not satisfy Brandt's team management, who fired him. However, later in the year the Belgian Cycling Federation exonerated Brandt, and his  team rehired him. He stayed with them for the remainder of his career before retiring from competition in 2010.

Major results
2002
 1st Course du Raisin
2007
 1st Stage 1b (TTT) Settimana Coppi e Bartali

See also
List of doping cases in cycling

References

External links 

1977 births
Living people
Belgian male cyclists
Cyclists at the 2008 Summer Olympics
Olympic cyclists of Belgium
Sportspeople from Liège
Cyclists from Liège Province